Marie-Christine Calleja (born 14 January 1964) is a former professional tennis player from France.

Biography
Calleja played on the professional tour in the 1980s. Her best performances on the WTA Tour were quarter-final appearances at Brighton in 1983 and Nashville in 1984.

She was a member of the French team which competed at the 1984 Federation Cup, playing the opening singles rubber of three ties, including the quarter-final loss to eventual champions Czechoslovakia.

As a doubles player she was a semi-finalist at the 1984 French Open, teaming up with Australia's Charlie Fancutt in the mixed doubles.

See also
List of France Fed Cup team representatives

References

External links
 
 
 

1964 births
Living people
French female tennis players